Stephen Theodore Hauschka (born June 29, 1985) is a former American football placekicker. He was signed by the Minnesota Vikings as an undrafted free agent in 2008. He played college football at Middlebury College and North Carolina State.

Hauschka has been a member of the Baltimore Ravens, Atlanta Falcons, Las Vegas Locomotives, Denver Broncos, Seattle Seahawks, Buffalo Bills, and the Jacksonville Jaguars. He won Super Bowl XLVIII as a member of the Seahawks.

Early life
Stephen Hauschka grew up in Needham, Massachusetts, where he played on the Needham High School Rockets varsity soccer team, and the varsity lacrosse team. He also played trombone in the NHS concert band and NHS jazz band. He did not play football for the Rockets. He graduated in 2003 and went to Middlebury College with intent to play Division III soccer for the Panthers.

College career

Middlebury College
In 2003, Hauschka was cut from the Middlebury Panthers men's varsity soccer team and finished the season on junior varsity. Prior to his sophomore soccer season, Hauschka was urged by his friend, Scott Secor, to try out for the football team, where he edged out freshman recruit Jacob Lister for the starting kicker role. In his three seasons with the Panthers, he was a two-time All-NESCAC selection as both a kicker and punter. He owns the school's single-season and career records for field goals. He was named a District I Academic All-American by College Sports Information Directors Association (CoSIDA) during his senior year. He was a semi-finalist for the Lou Groza Award for the top college football placekicker. Hauschka was also a member of the Middlebury College lacrosse team. Hauschka graduated from Middlebury College with a B.A. in neuroscience in 2007.

North Carolina State
After graduating with honors from Middlebury College, Hauschka decided to forgo an acceptance to dental school and enrolled as a graduate student at North Carolina State in 2007. Since Hauschka was cut from the Middlebury College men's varsity soccer team during his freshman season, he retained one year of eligibility and won the kicking job for the Wolfpack. He then went 25-for-25 on extra points and 16-for-18 on field goals, which included a game-winning kick versus the Miami Hurricanes.

At North Carolina State, his first name was misspelled as "Steven," a spelling which he continued to use into his professional career.

Professional career

Minnesota Vikings
Hauschka was signed by the Minnesota Vikings in 2008 to share kicking duties with Ryan Longwell in the preseason. He would later be released by the team.

Baltimore Ravens
Hauschka was claimed off waivers by the Baltimore Ravens after being released by the Vikings. He was signed to the Ravens' practice squad on September 15, 2008. He was activated on October 30 to handle the long-range field goals and kickoffs, sharing kicking duties with longtime Ravens kicker Matt Stover. His first professional field goal attempt came on November 9, 2008, against the Houston Texans, where he successfully hit a 54-yard field goal.

An exclusive-rights free agent in the 2009 off-season, Hauschka was re-signed on March 17 as the Ravens chose not to re-sign Stover. On November 17, 2009, the Ravens released Hauschka, after he missed his fourth attempt of the season (he converted 9 of 13 field goals (69.2%) in 2009) and had an extra point blocked.

After his release from the Ravens, Hauschka tried out for the Atlanta Falcons on November 24, 2009, and for the Dallas Cowboys on December 21.

Atlanta Falcons
Hauschka was signed by the Atlanta Falcons on December 29, 2009, after an injury to placekicker Matt Bryant. He was waived by the team on August 15, 2010.

Detroit Lions
Hauschka was claimed off waivers by the Detroit Lions on August 18, 2010. He played two preseason games for the Lions due to Lions' starter Jason Hanson's leg surgery. He was waived by the Lions on September 4, 2010.

Las Vegas Locomotives
Hauschka was signed by the UFL's Las Vegas Locomotives on October 4, 2010. On October 8, Hauschka tied the UFL record with three field goals in a single game.

Denver Broncos

On December 12, 2010, the Denver Broncos signed Hauschka after a season-ending groin injury to Matt Prater. He was waived by the team on September 3, 2011.

Seattle Seahawks

Hauschka was claimed off waivers by the Seattle Seahawks on September 4, 2011.

In a Week 10 match-up against the Baltimore Ravens, Hauschka tied the Seahawks' record for most field goals in a game, by scoring five of them, leading Seattle to a 22–17 upset.

In the Wild Card Round against the Washington Redskins, Hauschka strained his calf, and was placed on injured reserve. On April 18, 2013, the Seahawks re-signed Hauschka.

In Week 4 of the 2013 season, Hauschka kicked a 45-yard field goal to give the Seahawks a come-from-behind overtime victory against the Houston Texans at Reliant Stadium. The final score was 23–20, after trailing the Texans, 20–3, in the first half. Thanks to Hauschka's game-winning kick, the Seahawks went 4–0 for the first time in franchise history. The Seahawks finished 13–3 and reached Super Bowl XLVIII, where they defeated the Denver Broncos, 43–8.

On March 17, 2014, the Seahawks re-signed Hauschka to a three-year contract worth $9.15 million, of which $3.35 million was guaranteed. He began the 2015 season by hitting his first 16 field-goal attempts, including four from 50 yards or more.

Hauschka was named an alternate for the 2016 Pro Bowl.

Buffalo Bills
On March 9, 2017, Hauschka signed a three-year contract with the Buffalo Bills. Competing against rookie Austin Rehkow for a roster spot, Hauschka won the competition on August 20. His kicking style, involving low line-drive kicks (which was one of the reasons the Seahawks, who preferred someone with a higher kick trajectory, did not re-sign him), was considered one of his strengths for Buffalo, as the greater power of a line-drive kick can counteract windy conditions.

On September 10, 2017, in the season-opening 21–12 victory over the New York Jets, Hauschka made his debut as a Bill. He converted three extra points in the win. In Week 3, Hauschka went 4-for-4 on field goals, including a 55-yarder, and converted all extra-point attempts, earning him AFC Special Teams Player of the Week. The following week, he was a perfect 3-for-3 on field goals including a tie-breaking 56-yarder in a 23–17 win over the Falcons, earning him his second straight AFC Special Teams Player of the Week.

Hauschka broke the NFL record for most consecutive field goals made from 50 yards or beyond after he made a 50-yard field goal against the Los Angeles Chargers on November 19, 2017.

In Week 10 of the 2018 season, Hauschka made all seven of his kicks, five extra points and two field goals, including a season-long 54-yarder, in a 41–10 win over the New York Jets, earning him AFC Special Teams Player of the Week. During the rematch against the Jets in week 14, Hauschka was hit in the back by Jets defensive end Henry Anderson following a blocked field goal attempt, suffering an injured hip on the play.

On August 28, 2019, Hauschka signed a two-year, $8 million contract extension with the Bills.

On August 27, 2020, Hauschka was released by the Bills after the team selected Tyler Bass in the 2020 draft.

Jacksonville Jaguars
On September 28, 2020, Hauschka was signed by the Jacksonville Jaguars. In his first game with the team, he missed both of his field goal attempts, from 24 yards and 49 yards, and was subsequently released on October 12. Hauschka announced his retirement from football on December 4, 2020.

NFL career statistics

NFL records
Most consecutive field goals made from 50 yards or further: 13

Bills franchise records
Most 50-yard field goals made in a season: 7

Seahawks franchise records
Most field goals made in franchise history: 175
Most 50+ yard field goals made: 15
Most consecutive games scoring: 94
Most consecutive games with a field goal: 19
Most field goals made in a game: 5 (tied with Norm Johnson, Olindo Mare and Todd Peterson)
Highest field goal percentage in a career: 88.8

Personal life
Hauschka married fellow Middlebury alumnus Lindsey Jones in June 2011 shortly after her graduation from Boston College Law School.

References

External links

1985 births
Living people
American football placekickers
American football punters
American people of Slavic descent
Atlanta Falcons players
Baltimore Ravens players
Buffalo Bills players
Denver Broncos players
Detroit Lions players
Jacksonville Jaguars players
Las Vegas Locomotives players
Middlebury Panthers football players
Minnesota Vikings players
NC State Wolfpack football players
Sportspeople from Needham, Massachusetts
Players of American football from Massachusetts
Seattle Seahawks players